The European Independent Film Festival is an annual international film festival dedicated to independent cinema. Held in Paris, France, it was created in 2006 by Scott Hillier. The festival is dedicated to the discovery and promotion of independent film making talents from Europe and beyond, showcasing films that demonstrate quality, innovation, and creativity in both form and content. 
These qualities are judged in 14 categories, 7 of which are open to non-European filmmakers (from the Americas, Australia, Africa, and Asia), and compete for 25 awards. Jury members come from all around the globe and have a variety of backgrounds.
The founder and president of ÉCU, Scott Hillier, is a Paris-based Australian filmmaker. He gained international recognition from his cinematography, editing, writing producing and directing portfolio and served as Director of Photography on the documentary 'Twin Towers' which won an Academy Award in 2003.

The 16th edition of ÉCU was held on April 9–11, 2021 in Paris, France.

As well as the film screenings, festival attendees participate in workshops, 'Meet-the-Directors' discussions in which the audience posed questions directly to the filmmakers. There was also a full program of live music hosted by ÉCU's partner Access Film-Music at the after-parties on all three nights of the festival.

Workshops 

During the festival, workshops available to all attendees are conducted by professionals in the film making industry. These workshops give a chance to the public to get into film making and to the enthusiasts to improve their craft.

Music 

ÉCU is a strong supporter of musicians. Along with the usual film festival activities, live music can be heard throughout the entirety of the weekend.

Meet the directors session 

After each screening, the audience will have the opportunity to meet the directors and participate in a Question and Answer session. Here they will be able to directly ask questions to the filmmakers and to discuss in detail the ups and downs faced when creating a film.

ÉCU-on-the-road 

Every year, the festival travels around the world making sure the “Official Selection” directors and films are made known. 
All this has been possible through the help of over 50 (and quickly growing) partner festivals, cultural centers and film commissions around the globe. During these events, some of the “Official Selection” films are screened, which furthers the size of the directors audience.

ÉCU-on-the-road

Categories 
The festival comprises both European and non-European films.

European Categories 

 Dramatic Feature
 Dramatic Short
 Documentary
 Animated Film
 Music Video
 Experimental Film
 Comedy Film

Non-European Categories 

 Dramatic Feature
 Dramatic Short
 Documentary

Worldwide Categories 

 Student Film
 Much More than a Script Competition
 Arab Special Selection

Past Editions 
ÉCU 2020

The 15th ÉCU - The European Independent Film Festival took place from 23 to 26 April 2020. Due to COVID-19 pandemic the festival took place online, with the films being screened on the festival's website, followed by the recorded Q&A sessions with the directors.

ÉCU 2019

The 14th ÉCU - The European Independent Film Festival took place from 5–7 April 2019 at Cinema Les 7 Parnassiens in Paris. The participants of the festival enjoyed the screening of 79 independent films, workshops dedicated to the filmmaking industry together with #sheshoots, a discussion panel focused on women filmmakers and actresses. In addition, there was the possibility to meet the directors and asked them everything about their film. Afterparties and live music performances were organised to close every day of the festival.

The winners of ÉCU - The European Independent Film Festival 2019:

ÉCU 2018

The 13th ÉCU - The European Independent Film Festival took place from May 4–6 at Cinema Les 7 Parnassiens in Paris. 81 films from 37 countries were screened during the 3-day festival.

During the festival weekend, international audiences were exposed to film and their filmmakers from across a spectrum of experiences, cultures, and genres. The Director Q&A sessions provided a setting for discussion between the audience and the directors on filmmaking, while after-parties throughout Paris extended these conversations into the fueled early morning hours. ÉCU endeavours to provide a cultural platform not only for entertainment but also for active networking across the independent film world.
Here are the winners of ÉCU - The European Independent Film Festival 2018:

ÉCU 2017

The 12th ÉCU - The European Independent Film Festival took place from 21st to 23 April 2017 at Cinema Les 7 Parnassiens in Paris. 73 films from 28 countries were screened during the 3 day festival. In addition, the audience attended '#SheShoots - Female Filmmakers in Conversation' discussion panel.

Here are the winners of ÉCU - The European Independent Film Festival 2017:

ÉCU 2016 

The 11th Annual ÉCU - The European Independent Film Festival took place from April 8 to 10 at Cinéma Les 7 Parnassiens, 75014 Paris. 77 films from 31 countries were screened over 3 days. Films competed across 14 categories and were judged according to their quality, creativity, and independent spirit in both form and content.

ÉCU 2015 

The 10th Annual European Independent Film Festival took place from April 10 to 12 at Cinéma Les 7 Parnassiens, 75014 Paris. During the 3 days screening, it showed 84 films from 32 countries and then came up with the award-winning list. This year's "ÉCU-on-the-Road", ÉCU went to São Paulo, Brazil, from January 29 to February 4; and Berlin, Germany, from January 14 to 15. Each event showcased more than 20 independent films.

ÉCU 2014 

The 9th Annual European Independent Film Festival took place from April 4 to 6 at Cinéma Les 7 Parnassiens, 75014 Paris.
As well as the film screenings, festival attendees had the opportunity to participate in an array of workshops as well as a series of 'Meet the Directors' panel discussions, in which the audience pose questions directly to the filmmakers. There was also a full program of live music hosted by ÉCU's partner Access Film-Music.

ÉCU 2013 
ÉCU 2013- The 8th Annual European Independent Film Festival took place from March 29 to March 31 and showcased 109 films from 35 countries. The festival was located at the principal cinema Les 7 Parnassiens; film screenings and professional workshops about screenwriting, directing, editing, acting, and sound mixing were held at Cinéma Action Christine. The Arab Section was held at Cinéma Lincoln.

References

Film festivals in Paris